Frank Thomson is a retired amateur Scottish football left back who appeared in the Scottish League for Queen's Park. He was capped by Scotland at amateur level.

References 

Scottish footballers
Scottish Football League players
Queen's Park F.C. players
Association football fullbacks
Scotland amateur international footballers
Place of birth missing
Year of birth missing
Drumchapel Amateur F.C. players